Agrotown Volya is a settlement in the Ivatsevichy District, Brest Region, Belarus, included in the Zhytlin selsoviet.

References

Ivatsevichy District
Agrotowns in Belarus